Culex (Lophoceraomyia) infantulus is a species of mosquito belonging to the genus Culex. It is found in Cambodia, China, Hong Kong, India, Indonesia, Japan, South Korea, Malaysia, Maldives, Myanmar, Nepal, Philippines, Sri Lanka, Thailand, and Vietnam.

References

External links 
A note on Culex (Lophoceraomyia) infantulus Edwards and its occurrence in Malaya (Diptera: Culicidae).
Colonization of Culex (Lophoceraomyia) infantulus Edwards and Tripteroides (Tripteroides) bambusa (Yamada)
Urbanization and its effects on the ecology of mosquitoes in Macau, Southeast Asia.

infantulus
Insects described in 1922